ISO 3166-2:GQ is the entry for Equatorial Guinea in ISO 3166-2, part of the ISO 3166 standard published by the International Organization for Standardization (ISO), which defines codes for the names of the principal subdivisions (e.g., provinces or states) of all countries coded in ISO 3166-1.

Currently for Equatorial Guinea, ISO 3166-2 codes are defined for two levels of subdivisions:
 2 regions (i.e., the Continental Region and the Insular Region)
 8 provinces

Each code consists of two parts, separated by a hyphen. The second part is either of the following:
 one letter: regions
 two letters: provinces

Current codes
Subdivision names are listed as in the ISO 3166-2 standard published by the ISO 3166 Maintenance Agency (ISO 3166/MA).

ISO 639-1 codes are used to represent subdivision names in the following administrative languages:
 (es): Spanish
 (fr): French
 (pt): Portuguese

Click on the button in the header to sort each column.

Regions

Provinces

Changes
The following changes to the entry have been announced in newsletters by the ISO 3166/MA since the first publication of ISO 3166-2 in 1998:

See also
 Subdivisions of Equatorial Guinea
 FIPS region codes of Equatorial Guinea

External links
 ISO Online Browsing Platform: GQ
 Provinces of Equatorial Guinea, Statoids.com

2:GQ
ISO 3166-2
Equatorial Guinea geography-related lists